The 1955 Estonian SSR Football Championship was won by Tallinna Kalev.

League table

Title play-off

References

Estonian Football Championship
Est
Football